Ermington is a village and civil parish located approximately  south of the town of Ivybridge in the county of Devon, England. The village is in the South Hams district and falls under the electoral ward of Ermington & Ugborough. It is twinned with the commune of Clécy, in Normandy, France and had a parish population of 824 at the 2011 census. It is known well for its crooked church spire, which a pub has been named after. It was home to Edmund Lockyer, who went to Australia and named a town, Ermington, in New South Wales.

History 

Ermington was probably founded soon after 700  at which point the Saxons were in control. It appeared in the Domesday Book as a royal manor. Near the boundary of the parish there is a place, called Penquit, which has probably been continuously inhabited since the Celtic times of Dumnonia. Penquit was recorded in 1238 and is Celtic for "end of the wood". By 1270 the manor house of Strashleigh was the home of the Strashleigh family, also written Stretchleigh, until the heiress Christina Stretchleigh in 1560 married Sir Christopher Chudleigh, grandfather of the adventurer Sir John Chudleigh. Nearby Strode was inhabited by the Strode family from 1238 and probably earlier. Although, since the 15th century, their principal residence has been in Plympton.  In the 14th century, its church, named after Saint Peter, was constructed and was later enlarged in the 15th century.

Education 
Ermington's only school is Ermington Community Primary School. It is a state-funded primary school (ages 5–11) following the National Curriculum. The school was first opened in 1879 and has been extended in 1997 and a double classroom was also extended in 1999. Ermington Primary School is one of only four primary schools in the county of Devon to achieve 100% pass rates (level four and above according to the National Curriculum) in English, Maths and Science at the end of year 6 National Curriculum assessment "SATs".
The village also has a small pre-school located within the primary school's grounds.

References

External links 
www.ermington.devon.sch.uk, Ermington Primary School website
www.ermingtonchurch.org.uk, Ermington's church, St Peter and St Paul, website

Villages in South Hams
Civil parishes in South Hams